Plum Creek is a stream in Madison County in the U.S. state of Missouri. It is a tributary of the St. Francis River.

Plum Creek was named for the plum trees near its course.

See also
List of rivers of Missouri

References

Rivers of Madison County, Missouri
Rivers of Missouri